The Life of Clutchy Hopkins is the debut album by musician Clutchy Hopkins. It was released in 2005 under the label Crate Digler.

Track listing

 "3:06" – 3:08
 "3:02" – 3:01
 "4:08" – 4:10
 "3:25" – 3:26
 "2:15" – 2:16
 "3:11" – 3:15
 "2:07" – 2:08
 "3:26" – 3:27
 "3:34" – 3:35
 "3:05" – 3:06
 "3:14" – 3:15
 "3:24" – 3:24

References

 http://www.fatbeats.com/catalog/product_info.php?products_id=6891
 http://www.cdbaby.com/cd/clutchyhopkins

External links
 Discogs.com
 Musicbrains.org

2005 debut albums